You Shall Die in Chafarinas is a 1995 crime thriller film directed by Pedro Olea. It stars Jorge Sanz and María Barranco alongside Óscar Ladoire and Javier Albalá.

Plot 
Featuring the backdrop of military conscription and set in a military barracks in Melilla, the plot touches themes such as the suicide of conscripts and substance consumption. Two begrudging privates (Jaime and Cidraque) see themselves forced to act as casual investigators in the wake of series of deaths in the barracks (two deaths from overdose and the ensuing killing of a homosexual conscript).

Cast

Production 
Based on the 1990 novel Morirás en Chafarinas by Fernando Lalana, the screenplay was penned by Pedro Olea and Francisco Lalana. The film is an Altube Filmeak SL production, with the participation of TVE. Shooting locations included a barracks in Aranjuez, Community of Madrid.

Release 
Distributed by Columbia Tri-Star Films de España, the film was theatrically released in Spain on 21 April 1995.

Reception 
Casimiro Torreiro of El País assessed that, while the script apparently features seemingly everything to be functional for an entertaining narration, the writing "lacks work to polish the details", concluding that "no one will be able to say that [the film] is not a well shot and interpreted film. But that alone is not enough to achieve a satisfactory product."

See also 
 List of Spanish films of 1995

References 

Films set in Melilla
1995 thriller films
Spanish thriller films
1990s Spanish-language films
Military fiction
Films shot in the Community of Madrid
Films based on Spanish novels
Films directed by Pedro Olea
1990s Spanish films